Mahmanshahr-e Torbat-e Jam (also Romanized as Mahmānshahr-e Torbat-e Jām) is a village in Mian Jam Rural District, in the Central District of Torbat-e Jam County, Razavi Khorasan Province, Iran. At the 2006 census, its population was 3,186, in 641 families.

References 

Populated places in Torbat-e Jam County